Vuma FM is a Zulu language South African commercial radio station based in Durban, Kwa-Zulu Natal.The station can also be heard online from its website and can be found on Facebook and Twitter

Launched on the 22 November 2012 as a commercial radio station. Content is 90% isiZulu and 10% English. Music accounts for 70% of the content and is inspirational with a 50/50 split between international and local. The remainder of the content covers topics such as lifestyle, news, current affairs, events and roadshows, and is inspired by community involvement.

References

External links
Vuma FM Website
SAARF Website
Sentech Website

Radio stations in Durban